The table of years in British television is a tabular display of all years in British television, for overview and quick navigation to any year.

Contents: 1900s - 2000s

1900s

1926   1927   1928   1929
1930   1931   1932   1933   1934   1935   1936   1937   1938   1939
1940   1941   1942   1943   1944   1945   1946   1947   1948   1949
1950   1951   1952   1953   1954   1955   1956   1957   1958   1959
1960   1961   1962   1963   1964   1965   1966   1967   1968   1969
1970   1971   1972   1973   1974   1975   1976   1977   1978   1979
1980   1981   1982   1983   1984   1985   1986   1987   1988   1989
1990   1991   1992   1993   1994   1995   1996   1997   1998   1999

2000s

2000   2001   2002   2003   2004   2005   2006   2007   2008   2009
2010   2011   2012   2013   2014   2015   2016   2017   2018   2019
2020   2021   2022   2023

Tables of years
British table